James Bennet (1830 – 3 May 1908) was a Liberal Party Member of Parliament in New Zealand.

Bennet was born in Forfarshire, Scotland.

He represented Tuapeka electorate from 1899 to 1908, when he died.

Further reading

References

1830 births
1908 deaths
New Zealand Liberal Party MPs
Unsuccessful candidates in the 1887 New Zealand general election
19th-century New Zealand politicians
British emigrants to New Zealand